George St. John (14 April 1878 – 19 February 1934) was an Australian rules footballer who played with Richmond and Melbourne in the Victorian Football League (VFL).

Notes

External links 

 
Demonwiki profile

1878 births
1934 deaths
Australian rules footballers from Victoria (Australia)
Richmond Football Club players
Melbourne Football Club players